The 1941–42 season was the 43rd season in the history of Berner Sport Club Young Boys. The team played their home games at Stadion Wankdorf in Bern.

Overview
Young Boys achieved a ninth place finish and reached the fourth round of the Swiss Cup where they lost to eventual finals runner-up FC Basel.

Players
 Maurice Glur
 Achille Siegrist
 Louis Gobet
 Otto Hänni
 Hans Liniger
 Hans Trachsel
 Hans Stegmeier
 Hans Blaser
 Willy Bernhard
 Willy Terretaz
 Gerber

Competitions

Overall record

Nationalliga

League table

Matches

Swiss Cup

References

BSC Young Boys seasons
Swiss football clubs 1941–42 season